Pito Hiti or Pito Iti is the second highest peak on the island of Tahiti in French Polynesia.

The name Pito Hiti comes from hiti, menaing "to get up" in Tahitian, but since the "h" is not pronounced in French, his name is sometimes written Pito Iti which literally means in Tahitian "little navel".

According to Tahitian legend the island was once inundated, with only Pito Hiti above the waves.

References

Mountains of French Polynesia
Mountains of Tahiti